Halsey is an English surname with several possible origins. It may be derived from Alsa, in Stansted Mountfitchet, Essex, England. This place name was once known as Assey, and was recorded as Alsiesheye in 1268. Another possibility is that the name is derived from Halsway, in Somerset, England. The latter place name is derived from the Old English word elements hals ("neck") and weg ("way", "road").

People
 Halsey (born 1994), American pop and EDM singer
 A. H. Halsey (1923–2014), British sociologist
 Alan Halsey (born 1949), British poet
 Brad Halsey (1981–2014), Major League Baseball pitcher
 Brett Halsey (born 1933), American film actor
 David Halsey (1919–2009), Bishop of Carlisle (1972–1989)
 Delbert W. Halsey (1919–1942), United States Navy officer and Navy Cross recipient
 Forrest Halsey (1877–1949), American screenwriter
 Francis Whiting Halsey (1851–1919), American journalist and historian
 Frederick A. Halsey (1856–1935), American mechanical engineer and economist
 Frederick Halsey (1839–1927), English politician
 George A. Halsey (1827–1894), American Republican Party politician
 Hugh Halsey (1794–1858), NYS Surveyor General 1845–1847
 Jehiel H. Halsey (1788–1867), U.S. Representative from New York
 John Halsey (privateer) (died 1708), colonial American privateer
 John Halsey (musician) (born 1945), English drummer
 Lionel Halsey (1872–1948), British Royal Navy officer
 Margaret Halsey (1910–1997), American writer
 Mark Halsey (born 1961), English football referee
 Neal Halsey (born 1945), American pediatrician
 Nicholas Halsey (born 1948), heir to the Halsey Baronetcy
 Sherman Halsey (1957–2013), American music video and television director
 Silas Halsey (1743–1832), U.S. Representative from New York
 Simon Halsey (born 1958), English choral conductor
 Sir Thomas Halsey, 3rd Baronet (1898–1970), English cricketer and naval officer
 Thomas Jefferson Halsey (1863–1951), American Representative from Missouri
 Thomas Plumer Halsey (1815–1854), British MP for Hertfordshire (1846–1854)
 Sir Walter Halsey, 2nd Baronet (1868–1950), British Army officer
 William F. Halsey Sr. (1853–1920), USN officer
 William Halsey Jr. (1882–1959), USN naval aviator and admiral in World War II
 William Halsey (mayor) (born 1770), first mayor of Newark, New Jersey
 The Halsey baronets, created in 1920

Fictional characters
 Dr. Catherine Elizabeth Halsey, scientist and creator of the Spartan II project in the Halo series of books and video games.
 Dr. Allan Halsey, Dean of the Medical School at Miskatonic University in H. P. Lovecraft's short story "Herbert West–Reanimator".
 Charles Halsey, President of the United States in The Outer Limits episode "Trial by Fire".
 Lt. Halsey, munitions specialist of shuttle Independence in Armageddon
 Admiral Halsey of the Planetary Union in The Orville

References

English-language surnames
English toponymic surnames